The 2023 Air Force Falcons football team represent the United States Air Force Academy in the 2023 NCAA Division I FBS football season. The season will be the team's 69th overall, 25th as a member of the Mountain West Conference, and 10th in the Mountain West's Mountain Division. The team plays their home games at Falcon Stadium and are led by 17th-year head coach Troy Calhoun.

Schedule

References

Air Force
Air Force Falcons football seasons
Air Force Falcons football